The Fox River is a river in the Westland District of New Zealand. It arises in two places; from a spring in the Fox Range, and from the head of the Fox Glacier. It runs west into the Cook River / Weheka, shortly before it exits into the Tasman Sea.

The Department of Conservation maintains short walks alongside the river.

in 2020 the contents of a rubbish dump next to the river were washed downstream and along the coast.

References

Westland District
Rivers of the West Coast, New Zealand
Rivers of New Zealand